Mamoru Miura (Miura Mamoru; born October 23, 1956) is a Japanese jurist who has served as an associate Justice of the Supreme Court of Japan since 2018.

Education and Career 
Miura was born on October 23, 1956, in Japan. He attended the University of Tokyo and graduated with a degree in Law in 1980. He served first as a public prosecutor in several district courts, then as an official in the Ministry of Justice, then finally as a Superintending Prosecutor in several regional courts before being appointed to the Supreme Court.

Supreme Court 
On February 26, 2018, Miura was appointed to the Supreme Court of Japan. In Japan, justices are formally nominated by the Emperor (at that time, Akihito) but in reality the Cabinet chooses the nominees and the Emperor's role is a formality.

Miura's term is scheduled to end on October 22, 2026 (one day before he turns 70). This is because all members of the court have a mandatory retirement age of 70.

References 

Japanese jurists
1956 births
Living people